The Thomas A. Scott Professorship of Mathematics is an academic grant made to the University of Pennsylvania.  It was established in 1881 by the railroad executive and financier: Thomas Alexander Scott.

Recipients
Ezra Otis Kendall, 1881–1899
Edwin Schofield Crawley, 1899–1933
George Hervey Hallett, 1933–1941
John Robert Kline, 1941–1955
Hans A. Rademacher, 1956–1962
Eugenio Calabi, 1967–1993
Shmuel Weinberger, 1994–1996
Herbert S. Wilf, 1998–2006
Charles Epstein, 2008–present

See also
Thomas A. Scott Fellowship in Hygiene

External links
University of Pennsylvania Mathematics Department page about the Professorship

References 

Professorships in mathematics
Awards established in 1881
University of Pennsylvania
Mathematics education in the United States
1881 establishments in Pennsylvania